Campsie is a hamlet in central Alberta within the County of Barrhead No. 11, located approximately  west of Barrhead then  north of Highway 18, roughly  northwest of Edmonton.

The hamlet took its name, in 1909, from Campsie, in Scotland, the ancestral home of an early postmaster. The post office operated until 1969. The community was a block settlement established by Black Canadian homesteaders from Oklahoma and Texas, within four to five years of Alberta becoming a province in 1905.

Climate

Demographics 
Campsie recorded a population of 65 in the 1991 Census of Population conducted by Statistics Canada.

See also 
List of communities in Alberta
List of hamlets in Alberta
Similar 1908 to 1910 Alberta homesteader settlements of Black Canadians:
Amber Valley, Alberta
Junkins (now Wildwood), Alberta
Keystone (now Breton), Alberta

References 

Black Canadian culture in Alberta
Black Canadian settlements
County of Barrhead No. 11
Hamlets in Alberta
Populated places established by African Americans